William Henry Smith (7 July 1792 – 28 July 1865) was a British entrepreneur whose business included both newsagents and book shops. He was born in Little Thurlow, Suffolk, but ran his business in London, where he died. The family business evolved into the chain W H Smith.

Career

Born the son of Henry Walton Smith and Anna Eastaugh, William Henry Smith was brought up by his mother following the death of his father when he was only a few weeks old.  His parents established a news vendor in Little Grosvenor Street, London, the precursor of W H Smith in 1792.

In 1812, following the death of Zaccheus Coates, a business associate of his mother, he went into the family business in partnership with his mother and his brother.  In 1816 his mother died and the business was equally divided between him and his brother Henry Edward Smith.  William proved the more capable businessman of the two, and the firm became known as W H Smith. After his father's death, the business was valued at £1,280 (about ~£ in 2012, adjusted by inflation).

In 1846, he admitted his son as a partner, and the firm became W H Smith & Son. Book stalls at railway stations proved an especially successful endeavour.

He is buried at Kensal Green Cemetery, London.

Family
In 1817, William Henry married Mary Ann Cooper, a rigorous practitioner of Wesley's Protestantism: they married at St George's, Hanover Square and eventually they had eight children: seven girls, and one boy, who was also named William Henry Smith.

References

Bibliography
First with the News: The History of W.H.Smith, 1792–1972. By Charles Wilson. WHS, 1985.

1792 births
1865 deaths
British retail company founders
Burials at Kensal Green Cemetery
English businesspeople in retailing
19th-century English businesspeople